Ivan Provedel (born 17 March 1994) is an Italian professional footballer who plays as a goalkeeper for  club Lazio.

Club career
Provedel joined Chievo Verona in 2012 from Udinese. During the 2013–14 season, he played on loan for Pisa in Lega Pro Prima Divisione. He's playing on loan for Perugia in Serie B during the current season. He made his Serie B debut on 29 August 2014 against Bologna in a 2–1 home win.

In the summer of 2017, Provedel completed a transfer to Empoli for €1.2 million.

On 22 January 2020, Provedel joined Juve Stabia on loan. On 7 February 2020, he scored a late equalizer in a 2–2 draw to Ascoli.

On 5 October 2020, Provedel signed a two-year contract with Spezia.

On 8 August 2022, Provedel moved to Lazio.

International career
On 17 September 2022, Provedel received his first Italy national football team callup, as manager Roberto Mancini named him to be part of the squad for the UEFA Nations League games against England and Hungary.

Personal life
Born in Pordenone, his mother is Russian.

Career statistics

See also
List of goalscoring goalkeepers

References

Living people
1994 births
People from Pordenone
Footballers from Friuli Venezia Giulia
Italian people of Russian descent
Association football goalkeepers
Italian footballers
A.C. ChievoVerona players
Pisa S.C. players
A.C. Perugia Calcio players
Modena F.C. players
F.C. Pro Vercelli 1892 players
Empoli F.C. players
S.S. Juve Stabia players
Spezia Calcio players
S.S. Lazio players
Serie A players
Serie B players
Serie C players